Crib A'Glow is a portable solar-powered phototherapy unit that uses blue LED lights to treat infants with jaundice. The device was invented by Virtue Oboro, a visual designer and mother whose newborn son had developed jaundice. Crib A'Glow has won multiple prizes for innovation.

Background 
In 2015, Oboro's son developed symptoms of jaundice soon after birth. The nearby hospital had five phototherapy units; however, two were already in use and the other three were inoperable. Once he was in a phototherapy unit, a power outage led to him developing severe jaundice for which he received an emergency blood transfusion. Jaundice affects more than 60% of newborns throughout the world, with the most serious cases requiring phototherapy. In Nigeria, it is estimated that fewer than 5% of medical facilities have sufficient phototherapy devices to treat the condition. Approximately 100,000 infants die annually from jaundice, with many more experiencing permanent injuries. 

After Oboro's son recovered, she and her husband began their Tiny Hearts Technology company to work on the development of a portable crib that could use solar power to provide phototherapy to jaundiced infants.

Description 

Oboro was assisted by her husband's experience with solar energy and a pediatrician who helped ensure the device met phototherapy guidelines and was safe.

Manufactured in Nigeria and using local materials, Crib A'Glow is affordable, retailing at $360 compared to $2,000 for other phototherapy units used in Nigeria. Phototherapy devices used in developed countries have common side effects such as skin burns, dehydration, and rashes. Crib A'Glow avoids these side effects through the use of LED lights.

The portable unit is particularly useful in remote areas where access to electricity can be limited or inconsistent.

Crib A'Glow is in use at hundreds of hospitals in Nigeria and Ghana and has treated about 300,000 babies as of December 2021.

Awards 
Johnson & Johnson awarded Crib A'Glow $50,000 as one of six winners of its Champions of Science Africa Innovation Challenge 2.0. Tiny Hearts Technology, Oboro's company, received the third-place prize from the Africa Business Center of the United States Chamber of Commerce for its inaugural Digital Innovation Awards in 2020. The device was selected by the Royal Academy of Engineering for the Africa Prize 2022 shortlist.

References 

Healthcare in Nigeria
Medical technology